The following is a list of American Eagles men's basketball head coaches. The Eagles have had 18 coaches in their 97-season history.

American's current head coach is Mike Brennan. He was hired in April 2013 to replace Jeff Jones, who left to take the same position at Old Dominion.

References

American

American Eagles men's basketball coaches